James Craven (1935–1980) was an Irish poet. He was born at Balregan, outside of Dundalk, County Louth.

Life 

Craven lived most of his life at his family home at Balregan. Despite having received an award for writing at the age of fifteen, he left school after completing his Intermediate Certificate exams. Throughout his life he was employed in various clerical and administrative jobs in Dundalk and briefly, in Dublin and Leeds. He was active in the Labour Party at grassroots level in the 1970s. Craven became something of a local legend during his lifetime, earning fame and infamy in equal measure, through frequent public poetry recitals and nightly carousing throughout Dundalk and its hinterlands. In his later years, Craven suffered from bipolar disease and alcoholism, spending intermittent periods in psychiatric care. He died in a car accident in 1980. The poet's self-penned epitaph, inscribed on his headstone at Brid-a-Crin cemetery near Dundalk, reads:
	
I’m not away
I shine in all your shaven
faces
Whisper through the
mystery of trees

Work 

During his lifetime Craven produced a sizeable collection of work, the quality of which has been recognised by a number of distinguished commentators. Craven's poems were published locally, nationally and internationally in newspapers, periodicals and anthologies, at various points in his life. Two collections of his poetry, Selected Poems and Nice of You Jim, were published in 1983 and 2005 respectively. Craven's work was also included in Eugene Robert Platt's A Patrick Kavanagh Anthology in 1973 and Daniel J. Casey's Poetry of the Cúchulainn Country in 1978.

Craven was also involved in the Dundalk theatre scene, penning several plays and becoming a locally renowned actor.

Content and style 

Craven's poetry deals with a number of subjects central to Irish writing of the time. He explores themes such as childhood, nature, rurality, sexuality, love, violence, religion, mythology and history. During the Troubles of the 1970s he wrote scathingly of the bloodshed that was occurring in Ireland at that time, believing it to be senseless and unjustified.

Language, unbounded and malleable, is paramount to the work of Jim Craven and as the 'Bard of Balregan' he assumed the mantle of artistic preserver of the colloquialisms, nuances and the essence of his region. He employs a liberal amount of topography, citing townlands and focal points within the locale and creating a solid foundation and firm setting for his lines – a 'mise-en-scène' of rural Irish life.

In the preface to Nice of You Jim, Daniel J. Casey wrote of Craven: 
"He was a unique talent…Impatient with the English language, he created imagistic word magic and often drew on Irishisms to better catch the flavour of the place. His rhythms, sometimes unorthodox, gave dimension to lyrics, simple and complex. The style, perfectly echoes the voice."

His writing is also often tinged with both melancholy and mischief in equal measure. His reflections during times of depression serve as utterances of a severe sense of grief, self-loathing and solitude while his stinging satire spared no dimension of the social spectrum, parodying all whom he saw as deserving – from priests and paupers to politicians and paramilitaries. It has been suggested, on occasion, that Craven's death at the age of forty-five, prevented the poet from reaching his artistic zenith. Nevertheless, the substantial literary corpus that he left behind him is testament to the distinctive and prodigious talent of a man that the Irish playwright John B. Keane once referred to as 'a totally dynamic genius'.

Recent 

April 2010 saw the thirtieth anniversary of Jim Craven's death and was marked by a graveside commemorative celebration, featuring poetry readings and tributes to the poet.

In October 2010, Sometimes the Sun Screams, a play based on the life and works of Jim Craven, was performed at An Táin theatre in Dundalk. The play, penned by the poet's brother Paddy Craven as part of An Táin Theatre Festival, was met with widespread acclaim and helped re-energise interest in Craven's work in his hometown.

References 
Casey, Daniel. (Ed.) Poetry of the Cúchulainn Country. Dúndalgan Press, 1978.
Craven, Jim. Nice of You Jim. (Ed. Daniel Casey). Dúndalgan Press, 2005.
Craven, Jim. Selected Poems. Dúndalgan Press, 1983.
Lambe, Cormac. Poet of Oriel: The cultural and social significance of Jim Craven and the poets of the Oriel tradition. St Patrick's College (Dublin City University), 2014.
Platt, Eugene, Robert. (Ed.) A Patrick Kavanagh Anthology. Commedia Publishing, 1973.

External links 
Jim Craven's tribute to Seamus Ludlow, who was murdered by Loyalist paramilitaries in 1976. 
[www.seamusludlow.com] * 

1935 births
1980 deaths
People from County Louth
Road incident deaths in the Republic of Ireland
People with bipolar disorder
20th-century Irish poets